Alpinisms is the debut album by School of Seven Bells. It was originally released on October 28, 2008 through Ghostly International, and re-released on July 14, 2009 through Vagrant Records in the U.S. Vagrant also released the Deluxe Edition featuring 9 bonus tracks on October 13, 2009.

Track listing

Personnel
Benjamin Curtis - guitar
Alejandra de la Deheza - vocals, guitar
Claudia Deheza - backing vocals, synthesizers

2008 debut albums
School of Seven Bells albums
Ghostly International albums
Vagrant Records albums